Saint-Julien-Boutières (Vivaro-Alpine: Sant Julian de Botèiras) is a former commune in the Ardèche department in southern France. On 1 January 2019, it was merged into the new commune of Saint-Julien-d'Intres.

Population

See also
Communes of the Ardèche department

References

Former communes of Ardèche
Ardèche communes articles needing translation from French Wikipedia
Populated places disestablished in 2019